Emily Price was an English stage actress of the seventeenth century. She was a member of the Duke's Company between 1676 and 1682, acting at the Dorset Garden Theatre in London and then joined the merged United Company. She was a friend of the playwright Aphra Behn and appeared in several of her plays. She was billed as Mrs Price.

Selected roles
 Christina in Squire Oldsapp by Thomas D'Urfey (1678)
 Helena in The Destruction of Troy by John Banks (1678)
 Lucretia in Sir Patient Fancy by Aphra Behn (1678)
 Violante in The Counterfeits by John Leanerd (1678)
 Camilla in Friendship in Fashion by Thomas Otway (1678)
 Edraste in The Loyal General by Nahum Tate (1679)
 Adorna in Caesar Borgia by Nathaniel Lee (1679)
 Sylvia in The Soldier's Fortune by Thomas Otway (1680)
 Diana in The Revenge by Aphra Behn (1680)
 Priscilla in Mr Turbulent by Anonymous (1680)
 Security's Wife in Cuckold's Haven by Nahum Tate (1685)
 Hippolita in A Commonwealth of Women by Thomas D'Urfey (1685)
 Jane in The Devil of a Wife by Thomas Jevon (1686)

References

Bibliography
 Lanier, Henry Wysham. The First English Actresses: From the Initial Appearance of Women on the Stage in 1660 Till 1700. The Players, 1930.
 Van Lennep, W. The London Stage, 1660–1800: Volume One, 1660–1700. Southern Illinois University Press, 1960.
 Woodcock, George. Aphra Behn: The English Sappho. Black Rose Books, 1989.

17th-century English people
English stage actresses
17th-century English actresses
Year of birth unknown
Year of death unknown